The 1988 NCAA Division I Field Hockey Championship was the eighth women's collegiate field hockey tournament organized by the National Collegiate Athletic Association, to determine the top college field hockey team in the United States. The Old Dominion Lady Monarchs won their fourth championship, defeating the Iowa Hawkeyes in the final. The championship rounds were held at Franklin Field in Philadelphia, Pennsylvania.

Bracket

References 

1988
Field Hockey
1988 in women's field hockey
1988 in sports in Pennsylvania
Women's sports in Pennsylvania